Hadley Alexander Wickham (born 14 October 1979) is a statistician from New Zealand and Chief Scientist at Posit, PBC (former RStudio Inc.) and an adjunct Professor of statistics at the University of Auckland, Stanford University, and Rice University. He is best known for his development of open-source software for the R statistical programming language for data visualisation, including ggplot2, and other tidyverse packages, which support a tidy data approach to data science.

Education and career
Wickham was born in Hamilton, New Zealand. He received a Bachelors degree in Human Biology and a masters degree in statistics at the University of Auckland in 1999–2004 and his PhD at Iowa State University in 2008 supervised by Di Cook and Heike Hofmann.

Wickham is a prominent and active member of the R user community and has developed several notable and widely used packages including ggplot2, plyr, dplyr, and reshape2. Wickham's data analysis packages for R are collectively known as the tidyverse. According to Wickham's tidy data approach, each variable should be a column, each observation should be a row, and each type of observational unit should be a table.

Honors and awards
In 2006 he was awarded the John Chambers Award for Statistical Computing for his work developing tools for data reshaping and visualisation. Wickham was named a Fellow by the American Statistical Association in 2015 for "pivotal contributions to statistical practice through innovative and pioneering research in statistical graphics and computing". Wickham was awarded the international COPSS Presidents' Award in 2019 for "influential work in statistical computing, visualisation, graphics, and data analysis" including "making statistical thinking and computing accessible to a large audience".

Personal life
Wickham's sister Charlotte Wickham is also a statistician.

Publications 
Wickhams publications include:

References

External links 

 On the web
 twitter
 github
 interviews
 Interview by Datascience.LA at UseR! 2014
 Interview by Yixuan Qiu (2013)
 Interview by Models are 
 talks
 Speaker Hadley Wickham Strata 2014 - O'Reilly Conferences, February 11 - 13, 2014, Santa Clara, CA 
 Interview at Strata 2014 Illuminating and Wrong
 Ihaka Lecture Series 2017: Expressing yourself with R

1979 births
Living people
New Zealand computer scientists
New Zealand statisticians
New Zealand expatriates in the United States
Data scientists
Fellows of the American Statistical Association
R (programming language) people